Eoophyla dendrophila is a moth in the family Crambidae. It was described by Wolfgang Speidel, Wolfram Mey and Christian H. Schulze in 2002. It is found in Sabah, Malaysia.

References

Eoophyla
Moths described in 2002